Gregory Brenes Obando (born April 21, 1988) is a Costa Rican cyclist.

Major results

2006
 National Junior Road Championships
1st  Time trial
1st  Road race
2007
 3rd Overall Vuelta Ciclista a Costa Rica
2008
 1st  Overall Vuelta Ciclista a Costa Rica
1st Stage 13 (ITT)
2009
 Pan American Road and Track Championships
1st  Under-23 time trial
2nd  Time trial
 1st  Time trial, National Under-23 Road Championships
 2nd Overall Vuelta Ciclista a Costa Rica
1st Stage 1 (TTT)
2010
 3rd Overall Grand Prix du Portugal
 4th Overall Vuelta Ciclista a Costa Rica
 10th Overall Vuelta a Asturias
2011
 4th Time trial, Pan American Games
 8th Overall Vuelta a Colombia
 10th Overall Vuelta Ciclista a Costa Rica
1st Stages 5 (ITT) & 11
2012
 5th Overall Vuelta al Mundo Maya
1st Prologue
2013
 2nd Time trial, National Road Championships
 6th Overall USA Pro Cycling Challenge
2014
 1st Overall Tucson Bicycle Classic
1st Stage 1
 2nd Overall Tour of the Gila
2015
 2nd Overall Joe Martin Stage Race
1st Stage 1 (ITT)
 9th Philly Cycling Classic
2016
 3rd Time trial, National Road Championships

References

External links

1988 births
Living people
Costa Rican male cyclists
Cyclists at the 2011 Pan American Games
Pan American Games competitors for Costa Rica